Mise Quadam (English: Mission Quadam) is a 1995 adventure game developed by Agawa and published by JRC Interactive for MS-DOS. It was inspired by the  German science fiction novel series Perry Rhodan.

Plot 
In the year 2360, androids have killed all humans on planet Earth and now they plan to destroy all the vegetation using an element called Cybertrone. A small group of human scientists have hidden on Matna Plus, on planetoid between Mars and Jupiter. They want to destroy androids with the sodogomorator, a technology invented by an already extinct civilization on the moon Quadam. Willfram Kyrr and Eric Levassor flew on the moon as part of their first mission, but they fell silent after a few weeks. The main character is David Criggs, who flies the last far-reaching rocket to the Quadam, where his task is to find out what happened to the first crew, find the control center and launch the sodomorator.

Gameplay 
Mission Quadam is a point-and-click adventure based around exploration, conversations and puzzles. The game has many pixel hunting puzzles. The inventory is located at the bottom of the screen. The gameplay is wholly controlled via the mouse and the player uses single click commands.

Development 
The game was developed by Petr Mandík and Petr Bartáček's company Agawa, which was devoted to games with sci-fi themes. Having met at work through their shared education field, Bartáček became acquainted with Mandík's game Mavlin: Vesmírný únik and was impressed by its gaming engine, and saw the potential of making better games. The graphics were created by an external graphic artist who drew pictures directly onto paper. Mandík and Bartáček subsequently scanned the images into the computers and gave them animations.

Agawa released two games, both in the adventure genre: Mise Quadami (1995) and Swigridova kletba (1996). The company worked on two other adventure games: Orientální dobrodružství and MMA, both due for release in 1998, but their release was cancelled, and a year later the company was disbanded. By this time, Orientální dobrodružství  already had completed graphics, and the game engineers were preparing to use Swigridova kletba's game engine, which required major changes to be applied to the new game. At the time MMA was only in the planning stage. The company folded as the Mandík and Bartáček decided to change careers.

Reception 
The game received mixed reviews from critics with Score from 30% to 65%. Reviewers agreed that this is a very professionally conceived work, and included many firsts, thereby advancing the Czech adventures gaming industry.

Vladimir Ponechal reviewed Mise Quadam for Excalibur magazine. Ponechal noted that first thing that caught his interest was well-crafted manual. He praised game's story and humor. Ponechal mentioned that game's protagonist David resembles Dempsey. He likened the game to titles by Pterodon such as Tajemství Oslího ostrova and 7 dní a 7 nocí. On the other hand, animation and graphics were criticised. Ponechal concluded that Mise Quadam can be compared to best Czech adventure games of the time. He noted that gameplay and idea can compensate for poor graphics.

Tomáš Landa of Level magazine gave Mise Quadam 50%. He stated that game is more difficult than it should be because game's graphics is confusing. He also mentioned that story seems illogical on the first sight. He noted that he understood the story when he played the game for second time. He also criticised poor graphics.

Andrej Anastasov wrote review for Score magazine. He was very critical and gave 30%. Anastasovv stated that the game is very amateur performed. He stated that every aspect of the game is bad. He criticised graphics as ugly and story as weird. He was critical of gameplay that is illogical.

Matěj Baran of Riki magazine gave 55%. He noted that the game reminds him of Terminator. He noted that graphics and music are poor. He also noted high difficulty which resulted in nervous experience. On the other hand, he stated that he enjoyed much fun playing the game.

Legacy 
Mise Quadami was the first Czech game to use anti-piracy protection, and also the first game which had a comprehensive manual attached, with terms and explanations of the game world. The manual asked players to describe colours apparent at certain points in the game, making it impossible to play in black-and-white. These features all came into wider use among other Czech games.

References

External links 
 Level walkthrough

1995 video games
Adventure games
DOS games
DOS-only games
JRC Interactive games
Science fiction video games
Single-player video games
Video games developed in the Czech Republic